Henri Stambouli (born 5 August 1961) is a French former football player and a current manager.

Coaching career
Stambouli coached Marseille and Sedan in France.

He managed the Togo national football team, leaving the position in September 2008.

Personal life
Henri is the father of Adana Demirspor midfielder Benjamin Stambouli.

References

External links
 Manager profile
 Player profile

1961 births
Living people
Footballers from Oran
Algerian footballers
French footballers
Algerian football managers
French football managers
Algerian emigrants to France
Association football goalkeepers
AS Monaco FC players
Olympique de Marseille players
Ligue 2 players
Expatriate football managers in Spain
UD Las Palmas managers
Olympique de Marseille managers
Expatriate football managers in Switzerland
FC Sion managers
CS Sedan Ardennes managers
FC Istres managers
Expatriate football managers in Morocco
Raja CA managers
Expatriate football managers in Tunisia
Club Africain football managers
Expatriate football managers in Guinea
Guinea national football team managers
Expatriate football managers in Mali
Mali national football team managers
2004 African Cup of Nations managers
AS FAR (football) managers
Botola managers